"Juju on That Beat (TZ Anthem)" (also known simply as "Juju on That Beat", "Juju on the Beat" and "Juju on dat Beat") is a song by American hip hop duo Zay Hilfigerrr & Zayion McCall. The song was originally posted to McCall's YouTube channel on July 8, 2016, as a track from his mixtape Why So Serious?, where it received over 18,000 views. It was posted to his channel again on August 11, 2016, where it received over 45 million views. The song became a viral dance challenge. The entire song is a freestyle over the beat of the song "Knuck If You Buck" by Atlanta hip hop group Crime Mob featuring Lil' Scrappy.

The single charted on the US Billboard Hot 100, where it peaked at number 5.

The duo had appearances on Live with Kelly on October 19, 2016 (with guest host Ciara), where they performed the song and gave instructions on the dance moves and on Halloween day on October 31, 2016, on The Ellen DeGeneres Show.

Music video
On November 2, 2016, the music video for Juju on That Beat was uploaded to Zay and Zayion's YouTube channel, The ZayNetwork, where it received over 290 million views. The video is potentially based on the film Neighbors. In it, Zay and Zayion move into a suburban neighborhood and host a dance party in their front yard. The video won the 2017 Kids Choice Award for Favorite Music Video.

Charts

Year-end charts

Certifications

References

2016 songs
2016 singles
Songs about dancing
Internet memes introduced in 2016
Atlantic Records singles
Trap music songs
Viral videos